Sorry in Pig Minor is the ninth and final studio album by the Minneapolis-based noise rock band the Cows, released on March 10, 1998, by Amphetamine Reptile Records. It was produced by Buzz Osborne (aka King Buzzo) of the Melvins.

Track listing

Say Uncle ends at 5:44, and is followed by roughly five minutes of silence before a hidden track begins. The track is a rough, dub remix made during the recording sessions. After this track ends, a poorly sung country song begins, with studio banter played over the top.

Personnel
Adapted from the Sorry in Pig Minor liner notes.

Cows
 Thor Eisentrager – electric, acoustic & plastic guitars, backing vocals
 Kevin Rutmanis – bass, guitar, organ, la la choir (2)
 Shannon Selberg – vocals, keyboard, horns
 Freddy Votel – drums, la la choir (2)

Production and additional personnel
 King Buzzo – producer, la la choir (2)
 Amanda Ferguson – la la choir (2)
 Dave Gardner – recording
 Randy Hawkins – recording, mixing, Shiksa whistle (7)
 Paul Metzger – cover art, design

Release history

References

External links 
 

1998 albums
Amphetamine Reptile Records albums
Cows (band) albums